The 2015–16 season is Loyola's 7th season in the Philippines premier league, the UFL Division 1.

Current squad

Overview

References

United Football League
F.C. Meralco Manila seasons